Ingrid Margareta Almqvist (10 October 1927 – 9 November 2017) was a Swedish javelin thrower. She competed at the 1948, 1956 and 1960 Summer Olympics and finished in 10th, 5th and 14th place, respectively. She placed 8th–10th at the European championships of 1950–1958. Almqvist won 15 Swedish javelin titles in 1947, 1949–52 and 1954–64. In addition to athletics, she played 11 international handball matches for Sweden and competed nationally in fencing.

References

Further reading 
  

1927 births
2017 deaths
Swedish female javelin throwers
Olympic athletes of Sweden
Athletes (track and field) at the 1948 Summer Olympics
Athletes (track and field) at the 1956 Summer Olympics
Athletes (track and field) at the 1960 Summer Olympics
Athletes from Gothenburg